Lygodium microphyllum (commonly known as, variously, climbing maidenhair fern, Old World climbing fern, small-leaf climbing fern, or snake fern) is a climbing fern originating in tropical Africa, Southeast Asia, Melanesia and Australia. It is an invasive weed in Florida where it invades open forest and wetland areas. The type specimen was collected in the vicinity of Nabúa, on the island of Luzon in the Philippines by Luis Née.

Distribution

Lygodium microphyllum is native to much of tropical Africa and South Africa; tropical Asia, including China, Ryukyu Islands of Japan; Australia; Fiji, the Mariana Islands and Caroline Islands.

Lygodium microphyllum has become naturalized in the Caribbean and South Florida.

Effects on the environment 
Lygodium microphyllum causes problems in the environments where it is invasive.  The plant damages wetland ecosystems, harming endangered species.  The ferns ability to grow up and over trees and shrubs and to form dense horizontal canopies allows it to cover whole communities of plants, reducing native plant diversity. Old World climbing fern can grow in many diverse ecosystems. Lygodium microphyllum poses problems for fires, both natural and man-made, because it can lead fire into the tree canopy, killing trees. The fern rapidly spread in South Florida's public conservation lands.

Containment 
Recently, the USDA approved the use of insects to keep the fern contained. Insects (Austromusotima camptozonale, Neomusotima conspurcatalis) and mites (Floracarus perrepae) have been released in several state parks to control the fern. Although some populations were devastated by a bout of cold weather, recently, reports of new activity have been made.

Ethnobotany
Lygodium microphyllum has been used locally in folk medicine to treat skin ailments and problems, swelling and dysentery.

Other uses
Lygodium microphyllum fibers (as well as other species of Lygodium), known as nito, are used to weave traditional salakot hats in the Philippines.

References

External links

 Species Profile - Old World Climbing Fern (Lygodium microphyllum), National Invasive Species Information Center, United States National Agricultural Library. Lists general information and resources for Old World Climbing Fern.
"Old World Climbing Fern (Lygodium microphyllum), a Dangerous Invasive Weed in Florida," American Fern Journal Vol. 88 No. 4 (1998)
Killer fern overruns refuge; agencies fight back, South Florida Sun Sentinel, 2018

Bibliography 
 Jeffrey T. Hutchinson, Kenneth A. Langeland, Gregory E. MacDonald and Robert Querns, 2010; Absorption and Translocation of Glyphosate, Metsulfuron, and Triclopyr in Old World Climbing Fern (Lygodium microphyllum). Weed Science 58:2, 118-125 Online publication date : 1-Apr-2010 (abstract)

microphyllum
Ferns of Africa
Ferns of Asia
Ferns of Australasia
Plants described in 1801
Flora of Africa
Flora of tropical Asia
Flora of Australia
Flora of China
Flora of Fiji
Flora of Japan
Flora of the Ryukyu Islands
Flora of the Northwestern Pacific
Flora of Taiwan
Taxa named by Antonio José Cavanilles